The Gleiwitz Case is an East German war film directed by Gerhard Klein. It was released in 1961. The plot was reconstructed exactly according to the statements of SS-Man Alfred Naujocks before British authorities at the Nuremberg trials.

Plot
The film depicts the Gleiwitz incident from 31st August, 1939, a false flag attack on a German radio station staged by the SS. The fake attack was carried out to justify the Invasion of Poland as a defensive attack before the international community.

Cast
 Hannjo Hasse as Alfred Helmut Naujocks
 Christoph Bayertt as Franz Sitte
 Wolfgang Kalweit as Hans-Wilhelm Kraweit
 Georg Leopold as Franz Wyczorek
 Herwart Grosse as Heinrich Müller
 Rolf Ripperger as Bieratzki
 Manfred Günther as Kühnel
 Rudolf Woschiek as Tutzauer
 Hilmar Thate as Sachsenhausen inmate
 Rolf Ludwig as SS doctor
 Friedrich Richter as Jewish professor
 Günter Naumann as SS man
 Paul-Dolf Neis as SD chief in Gleiwitz
 Werner Dissel as teacher

References

External links
 

1961 films
1961 war films
German war films
East German films
1960s German-language films
German black-and-white films
World War II films based on actual events
Films set in 1939
Gliwice
1960s German films